Sahebpur Kamal Junction railway station (station code: SKJ) is a railway station in the Sonpur railway division of East Central Railway. Sahibpur Kamal station is located in Sahebpur Kamal Vidhan Sabha Constituency in Begusarai District in the Indian state of Bihar.

References 

Railway stations in Begusarai district